California Lawyers for the Arts (CLA) is a non-profit organization founded in 1974 to provide legal services to artists and members of the creative arts community. The first Executive Director was Hamish Sandison, who was a recent graduate of Boalt Hall at University of California, Berkeley and is now a solicitor in London, England, specializing in law and technology.  In 1987, Bay Area Lawyers for the Arts (BALA) joined forces with Volunteer Lawyers for the Arts-Los Angeles (VLA) to form California Lawyers for the Arts as a statewide organization. CLA is part of an informal network of “Volunteer Lawyers for the Arts” programs that serve artists through state-based organizations throughout the United States.

CLA has offices in Berkeley, Los Angeles, San Francisco, San Diego, and Sacramento, and the organization serves more than 11,000 artists annually. CLA has nearly 1,800 paid members, including artists and arts organizations of all disciplines and cultural backgrounds, attorneys, accountants, and teachers.

History
In its early history, C.L.A. board members and staff worked with state legislators to promulgate artists' rights legislation in California, including the State's Resale Royalty Act (1976) and the California Art Preservation Act (1980).

In 1993, with the help of a National Endowment for the Arts (NEA) Advancement grant, CLA expanded its mission to include articulating “a role for the arts in community development.”  Following this, CLA received the first art-related grant from the San Francisco Department of Children, Youth and Families. In the mid-1990s, CLA began its statewide planning efforts, including a planning retreat with local arts agencies to include the arts in military base conversion.  This work led to both a national conference funded by the NEA Design Arts Program and subsequent projects in Marin, San Francisco, Monterey and San Diego.

Legislation

CLA has played a major role in enacting legislation for artists’ rights.  In  1976, CLA collaborated with Senator Alan Sieroty of Los Angeles to enact the California Resale Royalties Act, which provides artists with a royalty on the resale price of any work of art. California remains the only state in the United States with this legislation. Although the law has been under controversy since its inception, the United States District Court upheld the law in 1978 in an opinion written by Judge Robert Takasugi. The United States Court of Appeals affirmed the lower court’s decision in Moreseberg v. Balyon, 621. F. 2d. 972 (9th Cir,), cert denied, 449 U.S. 983 (1980), stating that the Act is “an economic regulation to promote artistic endeavors generally.”  

CLA also helped with the enactment of California Art Preservation Act (CAPA), California Civil Code Section 987. CAPA took effect on January 1, 1980 and granted artists the right of integrity, and the right of authorship. The right of integrity gives an artist the right to sue to prevent a work of his or her art from suffering injury, or to collect damages for an injury already suffered. The right of authorship provides an artist with the right to claim or disclaim authorship of a work of art.

Programs

Lawyer referral service 

CLA has a lawyer referral services for creative artists, arts organizations, and those with arts-related matters. The referral service handles arts and non-arts-related issues such as copyright, contract drafting, review, and negotiation, non-profit organization issues, landlord/tenant, organizational tax, employee or independent contractor, mediation and arbitration.  CLA has a panel of attorneys that specialize in various arts-related and other issues who then help each artist with the particular legal issue with which he or she is faced.

Arts arbitration and mediation services

AAMS was started in 1980 and provides alternative dispute resolution to artists, entertainers, and other members of the creative arts community. CLA’s AAMS program was the first alternative dispute resolution program in the United States to tailor its services for the arts and entertainment communities.

AAMS provides counseling, conciliation, mediation, arbitration, neutral evaluation and meeting facilitation. The service has neutral program coordinators who help artists throughout the state. AAMS coordinators also offer conciliation assistance, coordinate mediations with trained mediators, or coordinate arbitrations or early neutral evaluations.

Sacramento Mediation Center

The Sacramento Mediation Center (SMC) became a program of California Lawyers for the Arts in 2008 and is administered in CLA's Sacramento office. SMC provides mediation services to anyone in the Sacramento region on a wide range of topics and is not limited to arts-related cases.

Arts and community development

CLA launched The Arts and Community Development Project in 1993, which provides summer and year-round job and intern experiences in the arts to deserving young people.

Spotlight on the Arts is a program of The Arts and Community Development Project specifically aimed at deserving teens interested in the arts.  These teenagers are provided with paid summer internships, workshops on conflict resolution, college preparation and career development, and trips to live cultural events. This Project is funded by public and private agencies and individuals.

Publications

The Art of Deduction has been published by CLA annually since the 1980s to serve as a tax preparation guide for creative artists. This publication offers a detailed explanation of tax preparation issues including money-saving tax filing tips specifically geared toward the creative community.

CLA published the first edition of Legislative Masterpieces in 1980, in response to the need for a comprehensive resource on California Legislative initiatives to protect artists and their works. This publication is updated periodically as the California Legislation emerges. Legislative Masterpieces is designed to serve as a useful tool for the California arts community and others nationwide.

Artistic License Awards

Recent advocacy efforts have focused on restoring state funding for the arts in California, starting with a series of three symposia on California Arts and Healthy Communities, held in Los Angeles, Walnut Creek and San Jose from 2006-08.   The Arts and Environmental Initiative was begun in 2008 with a Dialogue in San Francisco, followed by a second Dialogue in Los Angeles in 2011.   An effort to restore Arts-in-Corrections programs was begun in early 2011.

In 2008, the organization began its Artistic License Awards in order to recognize leaders in government, law and the arts or arts organizations who have made a positive impact on the arts in California.

2011 recipients include:

Attorney Jay L. Cooper
Artist Frank Romero
Musician Cathy Segal-Garcia
LA Board of Supervisors Member Mark Ridley-Thomas
PEN Center USA
Malissa Feruzzi Shriver, Chair of the California Arts Council.

Past recipients include:

Geffen Playhouse
Robert Graham (in memoriam)
Munger, Tolles & Olson, LLP
Elsa Ramo,  Esq.
Former First Lady of California Maria Shriver
San Francisco Symphony
U.S. Representative Diane Watson
U.S. Speaker of the House Nancy Pelosi
Rhodessa Jones of Cultural Odyssey
Fenwick & West
Henry Hopkins, Fenwick & West (in memoriam)
Abe Carnow, CPA
Danny Glover and Ben Guillory of the Robey Theatre Company
Don Knabe, Member, LA County Board of Supervisors
Adolfo V. Nodal
Orrick, Herrington & Sutcliffe, LLP
Kim Curry-Evans
Stephen L. Davis, Esq.
Charles (Chuck) Miller (in memoriam)
Darrell Steinberg, California Senate President Pro Tem
Wayne Thiebaud, Artist
Rose Marie Cano of Plaza de la Raza
Greenberg Glusker
Jan Perry, LA City Council Member
Jack Scott, California Senator
Greg Victoroff
June Wayne, Artist
Zev Yaroslavsky, Member, LA County Board Supervisors

References

External links
 

Legal organizations based in the United States
Arts organizations based in California
Non-profit organizations based in California
Organizations established in 1974
1974 establishments in California